WPRF-LP (96.9 FM, "Restauracion 96.9 FM") is a radio station licensed to serve the community of New Britain, Connecticut. The station is owned by La Nueva Radio Restauracion 1620 AM Inc and airs a Spanish religious format.

The station was assigned the WPRF-LP call letters by the Federal Communications Commission on October 17, 2014.

References

External links
 Official Website
 FCC Public Inspection File for WPRF-LP
 

PRF-LP
Radio stations established in 2014
2014 establishments in Connecticut
PRF-LP
New Britain, Connecticut
PRF-LP